Made for Each Other may refer to:
Made for Each Other (1939 film), starring Carole Lombard and James Stewart
Made for Each Other (1953 film), a 1953 Mexican musical comedy film
Made for Each Other (1971 film), featuring Renée Taylor and Joseph Bologna
Made for Each Other (2009 film), starring Bijou Phillips and Christopher Masterson
Made for Each Other (Calvin Wiggett album), 1995
Made for Each Other (Sonny Stitt album)

See also
Ek Duuje Ke Liye, ((We Are) Made for Each Other), 1981 Hindi romantic tragedy film